The rufous-legged owl (Strix rufipes) is a medium-sized owl. It is found in Argentina and Chile.

Taxonomy and systematics

The rufous-legged owl has two subspecies, the nominate Strix rufipes rufipes and S. r. sanborni. The latter is known from a single immature specimen. At one time what is now treated as the Chaco owl (Strix chacoensis) was also considered to be a subspecies of rufous-legged owl, but the two differ in plumage, morphology, and voice.

Description

The rufous-legged owl is compact, with a round head and no ear tufts. Adults have a rusty facial disk, white "brows" over dark brown eyes, and white lores. Its upperparts are dark reddish brown with narrow orange-buff bars and spots. The tail is also reddish brown, with buff bars. The throat is white, most of the underparts are buffy white with many black bars, and the vent area is orange-buff. The legs and toes are covered with buffy feathers. The chick is downy off-white. The juvenile is a warm buff with faint dusky brown barring and a tawny face.

Distribution

The rufous-legged owl is found in Chile from approximately Valparaíso Province and in far western Argentina from approximately Mendoza Province south to the tip of Tierra del Fuego. The one specimen of S. r. sanborni was taken on Chiloé Island off the coast of south-central Chile. The species primarily inhabits moist old-growth forest with a closed canopy and a dense understory. It is also found in older secondary forest and semi-open forest. In elevation it ranges from sea level to at least .

Behavior

Feeding

The rufous-legged owl is nocturnal and usually hunts from a perch. Its primary prey is small arboreal mammals. Birds, amphibians, and insects are also taken but account for only a small percentage of its diet.

Breeding

The rufous-legged owl's breeding phenology is poorly known. It probably lays eggs beginning in October; the clutch size is one to three eggs. It usually nests in a tree cavity, either natural or excavated by a woodpecker. It occasionally will use an old raptor nest and is thought to possibly nest on the ground as well.

Vocalization

The rufous-legged owl's vocalizations are "a variety of grunting, hooting, and cackling noises."

Status

The IUCN has assessed the rufous-legged owl as being of Least Concern. It occurs in several protected areas but outside them is potentially threatened by logging of its mature-forest habitat.

References

rufous-legged owl
Birds of Chile
Birds of Tierra del Fuego
rufous-legged owl
rufous-legged owl
Fauna of the Valdivian temperate rainforest